Hell Hath No Fury Like a Woman Scorned is a 2014 American stage play written, produced, and directed by Tyler Perry. It stars Cheryl Pepsii Riley as Anita and Patrice Lovely as Mama Hattie. The live performance released on DVD (November 25, 2014) was recorded live in Atlanta at the Cobb Energy Performing Arts Centre on September 18 - 20, 2013. The DVD was released alongside A Madea Christmas.

Plot
Anita, a single woman, meets a man online thanks to encouragement from a friend. At first he treats her like a queen, they get married, and things change. Anita then turns into a woman that she never knew she could or would become.

Shows

Cast
 Cheryl Pepsii Riley as Anita 
 Patrice Lovely as Mama Hattie 
 Ray Lavender as Victor
 Monica Blaire as Jasmine
 Zebulon Ellis as Reverend Walker
 Muhammad Ayers as Randy 
 Candice Pye as Mona
 Olrick Johnson as Officer Larry

The Band 

 Ronnie Garrett - Musical Director / Bass Guitar
 Derek Scott - Guitar
 Marcus Williams - Drums
 Michael Burton - Saxophone
 Natalie Ragins - Keyboards / Organs
 Vance Taylor - Keyboards #2
 Aaron Draper - Percussion
 Wilburt Williams - Trombone
 Melvin Jones - Trumpet
 Sheryl Boyd - Background Vocals
 Lindsay Fields - Background Vocals
 Greg Kirkland - Background Vocals

Musical Numbers 
All songs written and/or produced by Tyler Perry and Elvin D. Ross.

 "To God Be The Glory" - Anita
 "I'm Glad I Found You" - Mona and Victor
 "Get Up Get Out" - Jasmine
 "Just Let Go" - Randy
 "Hell Hath No Fury Like A Woman Scorned" - Mama Hattie
 "God Cares For You" - Reverend Walker
 "Enough Is Enough" - Anita

External links
Tyler Perry Official website

Plays by Tyler Perry
2014 plays
African-American plays